Catherine Power, or variants, may refer to:

 Catherine Power (born 1985), Canadian wrestler
 Catharine Power (died 1769), Irish noblewoman, daughter of James Power, 8th Baron Power
 Cat Power (born 1972), American singer-songwriter, musician and model
 Katherine Ann Power (born 1949), American ex-convict and long-term fugitive